Joris Pibke is a New Caledonian former international footballer who played as a forward. He is one of his country's top scorers, and in 2002 was one of the top international goalscorers worldwide.

Career statistics

International

International goals
Scores and results list New Caledonia's goal tally first.

References

Date of birth unknown
Living people
New Caledonian footballers
New Caledonia international footballers
Association football forwards
Year of birth missing (living people)